AltiGator is a multirotor unmanned aerial vehicle manufacturer founded in 2008 and headquartered in Waterloo, Walloon Brabant, Belgium. It produces complete ready-to-fly radio-controlled miniature UAVs for various professional applications. It also holds a web-shop providing spare parts, self-assembly kits and accessories for drones.

Activity 

AltiGator UAVs are registered under the OnyxStar trademark which is a brand for Remotely Piloted Aircraft System (RPAS) and camera mounts dedicated to this sector. They are embedding Pixhawk or MikroKopter's flight electronics and can lift a broad range of sensors.

Civil Aviation Authorities 

AltiGator builds French DGAC-certified Unmanned Air Systems (UAS) used by many UAV operators in France as listed on the Directorate General for Civil Aviation website. Therefore, the company is also listed as a certified drone manufacturer on the Ministry of Ecology, Sustainable Development and Energy website because this Ministry is also in charge of Transportation and Aviation purposes.

In late April 2016, because of the brand new drone regulation in Belgium, AltiGator also became the first Belgian UAV manufacturer ever approved by the DGLV (Belgian Civil Aviation Authorities). Indeed, AltiGator drones are listed on the official list of class 1a certified drones.

Development 

– July 2014: AltiGator and YellowScan unveiled a complete solution for LiDAR scanning featuring the OnyxStar FOX-C8 HD together with YellowScan Mapper.

– October 2016: AltiGator and YellowScan unveiled a complete solution for Urban LiDAR surveying featuring the OnyxStar XENA together with YellowScan Surveyor.

Former UAV Models

Current UAV models

References 

 

Aerospace companies of Europe
Unmanned aerial vehicle manufacturers of Belgium
Unmanned aerial vehicles of Belgium
Belgian brands
2008 establishments in Belgium
Companies based in Walloon Brabant